Trijya is a 2019 Indian Marathi-language film, directed by Akshay Indikar and produced by Arfi Lamba, Katharina Suckale, Arvind Pakhle.

Cast

References

External links
 

2010s Marathi-language films
2019 films
2019 drama films
Indian drama films